Oleg Stepanovych Musii is Ukrainian medic, social activist, organizer of the medical service at Euromaidan, Minister of Healthcare of Ukraine in Yatsenyuk Government from 27 February 2014 till 2 December 2014. On 1 October he was dismissed from his post "for failure to ensure tender procurements of required medicines". In July 2014 Musii had complained about his lack of power to dismiss some of his deputies appointed by exiled former President Viktor Yanukovych's son Oleksandr Yanukovych: "I kept saying: do something, because people like these have to be in jail".

In the 2014 parliamentary election Musii was re-elected into parliament as an independent candidate in single-member districts number 124 situated in the Sokal with 29.86% of the votes.

He was formerly a member of the Petro Poroshenko Bloc until 18 September 2015.

the 2019 Ukrainian parliamentary election Musii did not manage to get elected (as an independent candidate) to parliament. In election district 124 in Chervonograd he became only the sixth with a result of 9.55%. Yuri Kamelchuk, a candidate from the "Servants of the People", won 16.08%. In the same district.

References

External links 
Biography

1965 births
Living people
People from Lviv Oblast
20th-century Ukrainian physicians
Healthcare ministers of Ukraine
People of the Euromaidan
21st-century Ukrainian politicians
Laureates of the Diploma of the Verkhovna Rada of Ukraine